Callahan Creek is a stream in Boone County in the U.S. state of Missouri. It is a tributary of Perche Creek.

The stream headwaters arise in northwest Boone County just southeast of Harrisburg adjacent to Missouri Route 124 (at ) and it flows south to southeast to its confluence with Perche Creek (at ) about one half mile north of I-70 at the northwest corner of Columbia.

A variant name was Callaham's Creek. The creek's name is a corruption of the last name of William Callaham, a pioneer settler.

See also
List of rivers of Missouri

References

Rivers of Boone County, Missouri
Rivers of Missouri